Confessions is a 1925 British silent comedy film directed by W. P. Kellino and starring Ian Hunter, Joan Lockton and Eric Bransby Williams. It was based on the novel Confession Corner by Baillie Reynolds.

Cast
 Ian Hunter as Charles Oddy
 Joan Lockton as Phoebe Vollings
 Eric Bransby Williams as Percy Denham
 Gladys Hamer as Ada Best
 Fred Raynham as E.H. Slack
 W.G. Saunders as James Barnes
 Lewis Shaw as Henry
 Moore Marriott as Hardy
 Lewis Gilbert as Mr. Vallings
 Dodo Watts as Child

References

Bibliography
 Low, Rachael. History of the British Film, 1918-1929. George Allen & Unwin, 1971.

1925 films
1925 comedy films
British comedy films
British silent feature films
Films based on British novels
Films directed by W. P. Kellino
Films shot at Cricklewood Studios
Stoll Pictures films
British black-and-white films
1920s English-language films
1920s British films
Silent comedy films